The 2012–13 SV Sandhausen season is the 98th season in the club's football history. In 2012–13 the club played in the 2. Bundesliga, the second tier of German football. It was the clubs first-ever season in this league, having won promotion from the 3. Liga in 2011–12.

Review and events
The club also took part in the 2012–13 edition of the DFB-Pokal, the German Cup, where it reached the second round and lost to Bundesliga side Schalke 04.

Matches

Legend

Friendly matches

2. Bundesliga

References

External links
 2012–13 2012–13 SV Sandhausen season at Weltfussball.de 
 2012–13 2012–13 SV Sandhausen season at kicker.de 
 2012–13 2012–13 SV Sandhausen season at Fussballdaten.de 

Sandhausen
SV Sandhausen seasons